Theodore Roosevelt High School is a public high school operated by the District of Columbia Public Schools in the Petworth neighborhood of Ward 4 neighborhood of Northwest Washington, D.C. Roosevelt enrolls 698 students (2017–2018) in ninth through 12th grade. Additionally, the high school is also home to Roosevelt S.T.A.Y. program, an alternative academic and career/technical program that leads to a high school diploma or vocational certificate.

The high school, located at 13th and Upshur Streets NW, was built in 1932 to accommodate 1,200 students. Just before the 2016–2017 academic year, it completed a $121 million, two-year facility modernization. During the renovation period, classes were conducted at the MacFarland Middle School campus nearby at 4400 Iowa Avenue, NW.  The school campus has been listed on the National Register of Historic Places.

History 

Plans for the school began in 1920, and it opened in 1932. The 64-room school was designed to hold 1,551 students.  Alongside a regular college entrance curriculum, the school included business-oriented classes to accommodate the interests of white students who had previously been served by the Business High School at Ninth Street and Rhode Island Avenue Northwest. The business focus was in contrast to the technical focus of McKinley Technical High School and Armstrong Technical High School. The school integrated in 1953, one of the first schools in the District of Columbia to do so.

Uncovered New Deal artwork 
In 1934, art students under the guidance of the Baltimore-born artist Nelson Rosenberg created a mural in the cafeteria. Titled An American Panorama, the mural was created as part of the New Deal-era Public Works of Art Project. It was later accompanied by other murals, added by later students, around the school. An American Panorama was uncovered during renovation work in the cafeteria in the fall of 2013. The fresco is currently being restored and will be incorporated into the final renovation.

Notable alumni 
 Ralph Asher Alpher (1921–2007), National Medal of Science 2005 for his research in Big Bang nucleosynthesis, and the prediction of the temperature of cosmic background radiation.
 Lennard Freeman (b. 1995), a basketball player in the Israeli Basketball Premier League
 Charlene Drew Jarvis (b. 1941), educator and former scientific researcher and politician
 Shirley Ann Jackson (1964), a physicist and the eighteenth president of Rensselaer Polytechnic Institute. She is the first African-American woman to have earned a Ph.D. at the Massachusetts Institute of Technology (MIT).
 Bowie Kuhn, Baseball Commissioner
 Ted Lerner, owner of the Washington Nationals
 Phil Perlo, American football player
 Abe Pollin, Owner Washington Bullets, Washington Capitals
 Sharon Pratt (Sharon Pratt Kelly, Sharon Pratt Dixon), 1961 – DC politician (Mayor of DC, 1991 to 1995)
 Diane Rehm, 1954, American public radio talk show host
 Bill Smith, former MLB player (St. Louis Cardinals, Philadelphia Phillies)
 Kate Smith (1907–86), singer, attended Business High School—likely class of 1924.
 Irvin Yalom, 1931 psychiatrist, author.

References

External links 
 

District of Columbia Public Schools
Public high schools in Washington, D.C.
National Register of Historic Places in Washington, D.C.
Petworth (Washington, D.C.)